NSHM Knowledge Campus is an Indian college with campuses in Durgapur and Kolkata. It is affiliated to the West Bengal University of Technology.

Campus
NSHM is an abbreviated word formed from four Latin terms,i.e, Notabilis, Sociatrix, Humanus and Maxime which means "Noteworthy Collaboration for Best Development of Humankind" in English.

The Durgapur campus consists of NSHM School of Hotel Management, NSHM College of Management and Technology, NSHM Business School and NSHM Faculty of Engineering & Technology.

The Kolkata campus has NSHM College of Management and Technology, NSHM College of Pharmaceutical Technology, NSHM Institute of Media and Design and an integrated NSHM Business School offering MBA programmes.

See also

References

External links 

 

Universities and colleges in Paschim Bardhaman district
Universities and colleges in Kolkata
Maulana Abul Kalam Azad University of Technology
Education in Durgapur, West Bengal
1997 establishments in West Bengal
Educational institutions established in 1997